Héctor Hugo Eugui Simoncelli (born 18 February 1947) is a Uruguayan football manager and former player. A forward, was a notably player with Deportivo Toluca.

Club career
Born in Mercedes, Eugui began playing football with Bristol de Mercedes. Soon, he joined Club Nacional de Football, where he won the 1969 Uruguayan Primera División, and C.A. Cerro in 1970. Eugui had a brief stint in Argentina with Argentinos Juniors before moving to Mexico in 1972, where he scored a goal in the semi-finals of the 1972 CONCACAF Champions' Cup and won the league with Deportivo Toluca F.C. in 1974–75.

Managerial career
After retiring from playing, Eugui became a football manager. During his time at Ciudad Juarez, Eugui helped ht team not to be relegated to Primera A, and the team advanced to the Clausura 2009 semifinals after they eliminated defending champions Club Toluca, but they were eliminated by CF Pachuca by an aggregate score of 4–3. For the next tournament after 10 games and only just tied four games and lost six without a win he was sacked. He managed Ciudad Juarez in 44 games, won 12, tied 12 and lost 15.

On 17 May 2011, Eugui was named the new coach of Toluca for the Apertura 2011 season. In 17 games, he managed to win four, tie eight, and lose win games. After the season ended, Eugui was sacked from the team.

On 13 November 2017, he was named the manager of Potros UAEM for the Clausura 2018 season.

Radio 

Currently, Hector Hugo Eugui hosts a radio show in El Paso, TX on KAMA-750AM with co-host and analyst former player Miguel Murillo

References

External links
Club Indios Coaching Staff

1947 births
Living people
Uruguayan footballers
Association football forwards
Club Nacional de Football players
C.A. Cerro players
Argentinos Juniors footballers
Deportivo Toluca F.C. players
Tigres UANL footballers
Liga MX players
C.D. Veracruz managers
C.F. Monterrey managers
Uruguayan football managers
Indios de Ciudad Juárez managers
Deportivo Toluca F.C. managers
Tecos F.C. managers
Real C.D. España managers
Uruguayan expatriate footballers
Uruguayan expatriate sportspeople in Argentina
Expatriate footballers in Argentina
Uruguayan expatriate sportspeople in Mexico
Expatriate footballers in Mexico